Zizania latifolia, known as Manchurian wild rice, is the only member of the wild rice genus Zizania native to Asia. It is used as a food plant. Both the stem and grain are edible. Gathered in the wild, Manchurian wild rice was an important grain in ancient China. A wetland plant, Manchurian wild rice is now very rare in the wild, and its use as a grain has completely disappeared in Asia, though it continues to be cultivated for its stems. A measure of its former popularity is that the surname Jiǎng, one of the most common in China, derives from this crop.

Cultivation
  
Zizania latifolia is grown as an agricultural crop across Asia. The success of the crop depends on the smut fungus Ustilago esculenta. The grass is not grown for its grain, as are other wild rice species, but for the stems, which swell into juicy galls when infected with the smut. When the fungus invades the host plant it causes it to hypertrophy; its cells increasing in size and number. Infection with U. esculenta prevents the plant from flowering and setting seed so the crop is propagated asexually, by rhizome. New sprouts are infected by spores in the environment, which is generally a paddy. Its Japanese name is makomotake. This vegetable has been grown for at least 400 years. It is popular for its flavor and tender texture, and it is eaten raw or cooked. Its taste resembles fresh bamboo shoots. It stays crisp when stir-fried. The main harvesting season is between September and November. This is typhoon season in parts of Asia, a time when many other vegetables are unavailable. This makes the product more attractive to consumers.

Invasive species
It has been accidentally introduced into the wild in New Zealand and is considered an invasive species there. It has been introduced into Hawaii.

Importation of the stems to the United States is prohibited in order to protect the North American wild rice species from the fungus.

Research 
This wild rice can be crossed with ordinary rice by protoplast fusion. Manual "repeated pollination", a different approach, produces fertile offspring with ~0.1% wild rice DNA.

The genome of the species was initially sequenced in 2015. In 2022, a new sequencing project produced a chromosome-level (2n=2x=34) assembly.

References

Flora of Myanmar
Flora of China
Flora of Assam (region)
Flora of Japan
Flora of Korea
Flora of Siberia
Flora of Taiwan
Flora of Vietnam
Cereals
Rice
Oryzoideae
Stem vegetables